Kota Division is one of the administrative geographical unit, called a division,  of Rajasthan state, India. The division comprises four districts, namely, Baran, Bundi, Jhalawar, Kota.

 
Divisions of Rajasthan